Nancy Alexiadi (Greek: Νάνσυ Αλεξιάδη) is a Greek singer and former contestant on Fame Story 3. She has released two albums, the most recent of which was released in October 2007. The music was written by Kostas Miliotakis, while the lyrics were written by Ilias Fillipou.

Biography
She studied fashion and styling and at the age of 19 decided to become a singer since she loved music due to her father being a musician. She had worked with famous singers until October 2004 when she decided to enter the Fame Story Academy,the Greek Star Academy show. After leaving the show she released her debut CD "Xero Pia Eimai" in March 2006 which gave hits such as "Prospathw" and "Meine" and has been working along Christos Dantis, Nikos Kourkoulis and lately Nikos Vertis.

Discography

Albums
2006: Xero Pia Eimai
2007: Afta Pou Eiha Oneireftei

Cover editions
2015: Oute Ta Lefta Sou

Singles & EPs
2012: Ena S'Agapo De Ftanei
2022: Mono Esi

References

1981 births
Living people
Greek laïko singers
21st-century Greek women singers
Heaven Music artists
Singers from Athens